Lutatius Catulus may refer to different individuals in ancient Rome:

Gaius Lutatius Catulus, Roman admiral during the First Punic War
Quintus Lutatius Catulus, Roman general and consul in 102 BCE